Hu Yanliang (born October 10, 1990, in Beijing), also known as Karen Hu, is a Chinese beauty pageant titleholder who was Miss Universe China first runner-up in 2014 session and represented her country at the Miss Universe 2014 pageant in the United States after the title was transferred to her from the original winner Nora Xu.

Personal life
Hu is a photographer from Beijing and a model. She clinched second place in the NSR China Model Contest in 2011. Hu graduated from Beijing Film Academy.

Pageantry
Hu represented Beijing at Miss China 2014 was placed as the first runner-up. Meanwhile, Nora Xu who represented Henan won the title of the pageant. During her reign, Nora Xu resigned from the title to pursue her studies at Donghua University, and Miss Universe China designated Hu as the new titleholder. She competed at the Miss Universe 2014 pageant representing China.

References

External links
 Official Miss China website

1990 births
Living people
Chinese beauty pageant winners
Miss Universe 2014 contestants
People from Beijing
Donghua University alumni